The Aruban Division Uno (English: Aruban First Division) is the second tier of football in Aruba. Since 2022-23 season, the top 4 team in each group of the league will enter the promotion/relegation playoff along with the bottom 4 team from the Division di Honor.

Clubs 2022/23 
The following sixteen clubs participated in the First Division during the 2022-23 season.

Pool A:   

 Atlantico      
 Real Koyari 
 Sporting      
 Estudiantes    
 Jong Aruba    
 Bubali     
 Arsenal
 RCS            

Pool B:

 Unistars
 FC San Nicolas    
 Caiquetio
 Rooi Afo 
 Sport Boys      
 Brazil Juniors
 Juventud TL
 Undesa

Clubs 2021/22 
The following fourteen clubs participated in the First Division during the 2021-22 season.

Pool A:   

 Sporting         
 Unistars
 Caiquetio        
 Estudiantes    
 Real Koyari    
 Jong Aruba      
 Arsenal             

Pool B:

 Santa Fe
 FC San Nicolas 
 RCS
 Rooi Afo 
 Sport Boys      
 Atlantico  
 Juventud TL

Clubs 2019/20 
The following fifteen clubs participated in the First Division during the 2019-20 season.

Pool A:   

 Caiquetio
 River Plate
 Sport Boys
 FC San Nicolas
 RCS
 Sporting
 Atlantico
 Estudiantes

Pool B:

 Arsenal
 Jong Aruba
 Unistars
 Real Koyari
 Juventud TL
 Rooi Afo
 Undesa

Clubs 2016/17 
The following ten clubs participated in the First Division during the 2016-17 season.

 Atlantico
 Brazil Juniors
 Caiquetio
 Juventud TL
 RCS
 Real Piedra Plat
 FC San Nicolas
 Sport Boys
 Sporting
 United

Champions

Team championships

References

External links 
Official website
Division Uno

2
Aruba